Bruce Smith (born 1934) is a former Republican member of the Pennsylvania House of Representatives for the 92nd District, which covers parts of York and Cumberland counties. Smith was elected in 1980 and retired in 2006. He served as chairman of the House Game and Fisheries committee.

Biography
Smith is a native of Harrisburg, Pennsylvania. He graduated from John Harris High School in 1952 and Elizabethtown College in 1956. He earned a Master of Education degree from Penn State University in 1961. 

He is the college's first alumnus elected to the Pennsylvania State House.

References

External links

1934 births
Republican Party members of the Pennsylvania House of Representatives
Politicians from Harrisburg, Pennsylvania
Elizabethtown College alumni
Living people